Paththarai Maathu Thangam is a 1959 Indian Tamil language film produced and directed by K. S. Mani. The film stars N. N. Kannappa, T. S. Balaiah and Pandari Bai. It was released on 22 May 1959.

Plot

Cast 
The following list was adapted from the database of Film News Anandan

Male cast
 N. N. Kannappa
 T. S. Balaiah
 T. R. Ramachandran
 M. R. Santhanam
 K. S. Rajam
 Gopal

Female cast
 Pandari Bai
 M. S. Sundari Bai
 Meenakshi
 Kanchana

Production 
The film was produced and directed by K. S. Mani under the banner Manivel Pictures and was released on 22 May 1959. Kalaipithan wrote the story and dialogues. Balakrishna was in charge of Cinematography.

Soundtrack 
The music was composed by G. Govindarajulu Naidu and Tiruvenkadu Selvarathinam while the lyrics were penned by Thamizh Azhagan, Subbu Arumugam, Ku. Sa. Krishnamoorthy, V. Lakshmana Das and Kavi Rajagopal.

References

External links 

1950s Tamil-language films
Films directed by K. S. Mani